Igor Pisarev (19 February 1931 – 2001) was a Soviet sprint canoer who competed from the late 1950s to the mid-1960s. Competing in three Summer Olympics, he won a silver medal in the K-1 1000 m event at Melbourne in 1956.

Pisarev also won a bronze medal in the K-4 1000 m event at the 1958 ICF Canoe Sprint World Championships in Prague.

References

Sports-reference.com profile

External links
 
Profile at Infosport.ru 

1931 births
2001 deaths
Canoeists at the 1956 Summer Olympics
Canoeists at the 1960 Summer Olympics
Canoeists at the 1964 Summer Olympics
Soviet male canoeists
Olympic canoeists of the Soviet Union
Olympic silver medalists for the Soviet Union
Olympic medalists in canoeing
Russian male canoeists
ICF Canoe Sprint World Championships medalists in kayak
Medalists at the 1956 Summer Olympics